Wachtmeister is a Swedish and Austrian surname. Notable people with the surname include:

 Axel Wachtmeister, Count of Mälsåker (1643–1699) was a count and Field Marshal
 Constance Wachtmeister (1838–1910), English/French countess, theosophist
 Erik Wachtmeister, co-founder of ASmallWorld
 Hans Wachtmeister (1642–1714), admiral general of the Swedish Navy and adviser to King Charles XI
 Louise Wachtmeister, co-founder of ASmallWorld
 Ian Wachtmeister (1932–2017), Swedish industrialist and politician
 Rosina Wachtmeister (born 1939), Austrian artist
 Ted Wachtmeister (1892–1975), Swedish rower who competed in the 1912 Summer Olympics
 Wilhelm Wachtmeister, Swedish career diplomat who served as the Swedish Ambassador to the United States

The Swedish noble family Wachtmeister (Swedish family) goes back to Hans Wachtmeister (d. 1590), who immigrated from Livonia in 1569 and received ennoblement in 1578. His grandson, Hans Wachtmeister, became count in 1687.

Surnames of Swedish origin
Surnames of German origin